Elmer Charles "Mike" Alft Jr. (July 13, 1925 - November 22, 2021) was an American historian and former mayor of Elgin, Illinois. Born in Chicago, Illinois, he graduated Phi Beta Kappa from Grinnell College in 1949 and received his master's degree from Syracuse University in 1950. He taught at Elgin High School for four decades while serving as city councilman, mayor, secretary of the Board of Trustees of the Gail Borden Public Library District, and various other capacities in local government. In addition he was a part-time instructor at Elgin Community College.

Alft was elected to the Elgin City Council in the at-large election in April, 1963. Four years later, he was elected Mayor, succeeding Clyde Shales. As was the custom at the time, Alft did not seek reelection when his four-year term expired in 1971. William Rauschenberger was elected to succeed him.

He may be best known as a historian of Elgin. He has published several books on the history of Elgin and the surrounding area, in addition to hundreds of articles for the local newspaper, the Elgin Daily Courier-News. He also wrote a biweekly column on Elgin's history.

Works
Your Illinois Banks, Illinois Bankers Association, 1957
A Century of Service: The First National Bank of Elgin, Elgin, 1965
Elgin High : a centennial history and record book, 1869–1969, Board of Education, Elgin Public Schools, 1969
Elgin Area Landmarks: A Community Heritage Tour Guide, Elgin Area Historical Society, 1975
South Elgin, A history of the village from its origin as Clintonville, South Elgin Heritage Commission, 1979
Hanover Township, Bartlett Historical Society, 1980
The Elgin Historic District, Elgin Area Historical Society and Gifford Park Association, 1980
Elgin, An American History 1835-1985, Crossroads Communications, 1984
Sherman Hospital: A century of caring, Crossroads Communications, 1987
Old Elgin: A Pictorial History, G. Bradley Publishing, 1991
Elgin: Days Gone By, Crossroads Communications, 1992
Books and More: a history of the Gail Borden Public Library, 1996
Elgin's Black Heritage, City of Elgin, 1996
Elgin Time: A History of the Elgin National Watch Company 1864-1968, Elgin Area Historical Society, 2003
An Elgin almanac: a book of stories, records, lists and curiosities, City of Elgin, 2004
Elgin parks: A community history, City of Elgin, 2005
Elgin: A Women's City, Elgin Area Historical Society, 2008
Promoting Elgin: A centennial history of the Elgin Area Chamber of Commerce, 1908–2008, Elgin Area Chamber, 2008
Hispanics in Elgin: A brief history, Elgin Area Historical Society, 2010
A History of Elgin History, Elgin Area Historical Society, 2011,

Sources
Alft Family History
Mike Alft, former Elgin mayor, historian and longtime library board trustee, dead at age 96

References

External links
Two books on Elgin's history by E.C. "Mike" Alft reprinted online
"Elgin's Days Gone By": E.C. "Mike" Alft's newspaper column

1925 births
2021 deaths
Schoolteachers from Illinois
American columnists
Grinnell College alumni
Syracuse University alumni
Mayors of Elgin, Illinois
21st-century American historians
21st-century American male writers
Historians from New York (state)
Historians from Illinois
American male non-fiction writers
20th-century American historians
20th-century American male writers
Politicians from Chicago
Writers from Chicago